Grandview Cemetery is a cemetery located at 801 Millcreek Road in Johnstown, Pennsylvania.

The cemetery association that operates Grandview was founded in 1885 to accommodate Johnstown's rapidly growing population.  The first interment was that of Lucretia Hammond of Kernville (now a part of Johnstown), who was buried on April 30, 1887.

The land for the cemetery, west of the city on Yoder Hill, was purchased from the Cambria Iron Company.

In the late 1880s, a steep and winding mile-long road named Millcreek Road was constructed to the original entrance of the cemetery, but in 1904 it was found necessary to create a new entrance to the cemetery at Bucknell Avenue.

The cemetery is best known because of the aftermath of the Johnstown Flood of 1889.  Many of the flood's 2,209 victims are buried there.  A section of the cemetery called the "Unknown Plot" contains the bodies of 777 flood victims who could not be identified.  A monument to the flood 
victims was purchased by the state of Pennsylvania and dedicated on May 31, 1892 before a crowd estimated at 10,000 that included the governor of Pennsylvania.

As of March 31, 1992, the total number of interments at Grandview was 57,006.

Notable burials
 Warren Worth Bailey
 Jacob Miller Campbell
 Elmer Cleveland
 John Graham McCrorey
 Daniel Johnson Morrell
 John Murtha
 George W. Reed
 John Marshall Rose
 John Phillips Saylor
 Howard William Stull
 Boyd Wagner
 Anderson Howell Walters
 George M. Wertz
 John Irving Whalley
 Elijah Payne Winchester

Notes

External links

 Grandview Cemetery at Find A Grave
 Grandview Cemetery at Johnstown, Pennsylvania website

Cemeteries in Pennsylvania
Buildings and structures in Johnstown, Pennsylvania
Protected areas of Cambria County, Pennsylvania
Tourist attractions in Johnstown, Pennsylvania